Brand is a municipality in the district of Bludenz in the Austrian state of Vorarlberg.

Geography
A tourist resort in western Austria, Brand is about five kilometres north of the Swiss border and eight kilometers east of the border with the Principality of Liechtenstein.

Population

Sports
Winter sports in Brand include both downhill and cross-country skiing, snowshoeing, sledding, winter hiking, skitouring, icefall climbing, skating, curling, horse riding, archery and indoor tennis.  Summer activities include hiking, climbing, mountain biking, golf, tennis, horse riding, fly fishing, canyoning, archery, beach volleyball and soccer.

References

Cities and towns in Bludenz District